Anthracobunidae is an extinct family of stem perissodactyls that lived in the early to middle Eocene period. They were originally considered to be a paraphyletic family of primitive proboscideans possibly ancestral to the Moeritheriidae and the desmostylians. The family has also thought to be ancestral to the Sirenia.
 
They superficially resemble the Moeritheriidae in both size and cheek tooth morphology, but lack their characteristic tusks. They were relatively small, ranging in size from 1 to 2 m in length. They are known only from fragmentary remains (mainly teeth) from Eocene deposits of the northwestern part of the Indo-Pakistan subcontinent. Recently excavated fossils with well-preserved jaws and teeth demonstrate that these animals were either perissodactyls or else part of a more primitive sister group to the perissodactyls. The anthracobunids were probably amphibious and lived in marshy environments. Analyses of stable isotopes and long bone geometry suggest most anthracobunids fed on terrestrial vegetation, but lived near water. The same cladistic analyses that prompted their new placement also imply that the semiaquatic marine desmostylians, another putative non-African afrotherian group, were closely related to the anthracobunids.

Notes

References

Prehistoric odd-toed ungulates
Eocene odd-toed ungulates
Prehistoric mammal families